Augustus Gilchrist (born 15 October 1989) is an American former professional basketball player. He played collegiate basketball for the University of South Florida Bulls from 2008 to 2012, with per-game averages of 11.4 points and 5.3 rebounds. In the Big East Media Day in 2011, Gilchrist was selected as a 2011–12 Preseason All-Big East Honorable Mention.

Professional career

Iowa Energy
After his college career, Gilchrist joined Iowa Energy of the NBA D-League in 2012 after being undrafted in the 2012 NBA draft. His two-year stint with the team had him averaging 6.9 points and 4.3 rebounds in 16 minutes a game for 69 games.

Granarolo Bologna
Gilchrist spent the first part of the 2014–2015 season with Granarolo Bologna and then later for Alba Fehervar. In 19 total games, he averaged 6.1 points and 4.8 rebounds in 17.5 minutes.

Alba Fehervar
Gilchrist signed with Alba Fehervar of the Hungarian League. However, he only played five games for the club, averaging 8.6 points per game and 5.2 rebounds per game in 14.8 minutes per game.

Mahindra Enforcer
In January 2016, Gilchrist signed with the Mahindra Enforcer as the team's import for the 2016 PBA Commissioner's Cup.

References

External links
Player Profile at RealGM.com
Player Profile at Basketball-Reference.com
South Florida Bulls profile

1989 births
Living people
African-American basketball players
Alba Fehérvár players
American expatriate basketball people in Italy
American expatriate basketball people in Hungary
American expatriate basketball people in the Philippines
American men's basketball players
Basketball players from Maryland
Centers (basketball)
Iowa Energy players
Terrafirma Dyip players
People from Clinton, Maryland
Philippine Basketball Association imports
Power forwards (basketball)
South Florida Bulls men's basketball players
21st-century African-American sportspeople
American expatriate basketball people in Thailand
American expatriate basketball people in Cyprus